A by-election was held for the New South Wales Legislative Assembly electorate of East Maitland on 15 September 1859 because the seat of Joseph Chambers was declared vacant because he had accepted appointment as a Crown Prosecutor at Quarter Sessions.

Dates

Result

The seat of Joseph Chambers was declared vacant because he had accepted appointment as a Crown Prosecutor at Quarter Sessions.

See also
Electoral results for the district of East Maitland
List of New South Wales state by-elections

References

1859 elections in Australia
New South Wales state by-elections
1850s in New South Wales